Dopa or DOPA may refer to:

 Dihydroxyphenylalanine (DOPA)
 L-DOPA (levodopa), used in the treatment of Parkinson's disease
 D-DOPA, an enantiomer of L-DOPA
 3,4-Dihydroxyphenylacetic acid or DOPAC, a metabolite of dopamine
 Dopa, an angel in Enochian
 Deleting Online Predators Act of 2006
 Department of Provincial Administration (DOPA), a department under the Ministry of Interior in Thailand